John Hayward alias Seymour (c. 1355–1407), of Bridport, Dorset, was an English politician.

He was a Member (MP) of the Parliament of England for Bridport in 1373, October 1377, 1378, January 1380, February 1383, April 1384, November 1384, 1386, February 1388, January 1390, 1393, 1395, September 1397 and 1399.

References

1355 births
1407 deaths
English MPs 1373
People from Bridport
English MPs October 1377
English MPs January 1380
English MPs February 1383
English MPs April 1384
English MPs November 1384
English MPs 1386
English MPs February 1388
English MPs January 1390
English MPs 1393
English MPs 1395
English MPs September 1397
English MPs 1399